Dunkerton railway station served the village of Dunkerton, Somerset, England from 1910 to 1925. It was constructed as part of the extension of the original Bristol and North Somerset Railway Camerton branch line, carried out by the Great Western Railway between 1906 and 1910. This created a new railway which ran eastwards from the former terminus at Camerton through Dunkerton, Combe Hay, Midford and Monkton Combe before connecting to the Great Western Railway main line at Limpley Stoke.

History 
The station opened on 9 May 1910 by the Great Western Railway.
The station was closed to passenger traffic on 22 March 1915 as a war-time economy measure, and to goods traffic in 1918 along with the station signal box. However the station and signal box were re-opened on 9 July 1923 to both passenger and goods traffic - the resumption of activity lasted a little over two years, and the closure of the signal box on 21 September 1925 marked the final closure of the station itself.

References

External links 

Disused railway stations in Somerset
Former Great Western Railway stations
Railway stations in Great Britain opened in 1882
Railway stations in Great Britain closed in 1925
1882 establishments in England
1925 disestablishments in England